Martigny railway station is a railway station in the municipality of Martigny, in the Swiss canton of Valais. It is an intermediate stop on the standard gauge Simplon line of Swiss Federal Railways and the junction of the  Martigny–Châtelard and standard gauge Martigny–Orsières lines of Transports de Martigny et Régions and RegionAlps, respectively.

The station has five tracks. Three tracks are located on the Simplon line, served by a side platform and island platform. There is a bay platform on each end of the station, serving the Martigny–Châtelard and Martigny–Orsières lines.

Services 
 the following services stop at Martigny:

 Regio:

References

External links 
 
 
 

Railway stations in the canton of Valais
Swiss Federal Railways stations
Martigny